The 2010 Slovak Super Cup was a football match played by the Corgoň Liga 2009–10 champions MŠK Žilina and the 2009–10 Slovak Cup winners ŠK Slovan Bratislava on July 4, 2010. The match was played in Štadión Pasienky, Slovakia. MŠK Žilina won 4-2 in penalties and earned their fourth Super Cup.

The match was attended by 1,237 viewers. Referee was Pavol Chmura, who was assisted by Erik Weiss and Gabriel Ádám.

Match details

References

Slovak Super Cup
Slovak
Slovak Super Cup
MŠK Žilina matches
Slovak Super Cup 2010